The Kalyani Group is an Indian multinational conglomerate focused in four primary sectors, viz. Engineering Steel, Automotive & Non-Automotive Components, Renewable Energy & Infrastructure and Specialty Chemicals. It has also made strides into defence manufacturing, which has been showcased in DefExpo 2020.

The group's annual turnover exceeded USD 2.5 billion as of 2011 and has joint ventures with companies such as Alstom, Carpenter Technology Corporation, Iochpe-Maxion, Meritor, Sharp Corporation, and Rafael Advanced Defense Systems.

History
The Kalyani Group was founded by Nilkanth Rao Kalyani. The group's first company, Bharat Forge, was incorporated on 19 June 1961.

The group is currently chaired by Nilkanthrao's son, Baba Kalyani.

Companies
The group holds key stakes in a number of companies:

Bharat Forge 

Bharat Forge is the Kalyani Group's first company founded on 19 June 1961. It manufactures automotive components as well as components for industries such as aerospace, railways, marine, and conventional and non-conventional energy. Bharat Forge is the flagship company of the Kalyani Group and has several subsidiaries. Bharat Forge Kilsta, Bharat Forge CDP, and BF Aluminiumtechnik are the company's Europe-based forging units. Defence manufacturer Kalyani Strategic Systems Ltd. is a wholly-owned subsidiary of Bharat Forge. Kalyani Strategic Systems owns a 51% stake in Kalyani Rafael Advanced Systems, a joint venture with Israeli defence company Rafael Advanced Defense Systems.

Sharp India 
Kalyani Telecommunications & Electronics Pvt. Ltd. was incorporated on 5 July 1985 by Bharat Forge. The company manufactured black and white and colour television sets, and videocassette recorders under the brand name Optonica. It became a public limited company on 20 September 1985. The company was renamed Kalyani Sharp India Ltd. on 2 May 1986. Japan's Sharp Corporation acquired a 40% stake in Kalyani Sharp India Ltd. in 1990. The company was renamed Sharp India Ltd. in 2005.

Kalyani Steels 
Kalyani Steels Limited (KSL) was established in February 1973 to fulfill the group's in-house requirements for forging quality steel. It manufactures special carbon and alloy steels, and alloy steel ingots blooms and billets.

Kalyani Carpenter 
Kalyani Carpenter Special Steels Ltd. was established in 1999 as a joint venture between Kalyani Steels and American company Carpenter Technology Corporation. Kalyani Steels' original facility in Pune is now operated by Kalyani Carpenter.

Kalyani Forge 
Ellora Engineering Co. Pvt. Ltd. was founded by Neelkanth A. Kalyani in 1979, and began commercial production of forgings in 1981. The company was renamed Kalyani Forge Limited in 1992.

Kalyani Technoforge 
Kalyani Technoforge Limited, formerly Kalyani Thermal Systems Limited, was established in 1979. It manufactures forgings, machined components, sub-assemblies and assemblies.

Automotive Axles 
Automotive Axles Limited (AAL) was established in 21 April 1981 as a joint venture between the Kalyani Group (35.52%) and American company Meritor (35.52%). It manufactures drive axles, non-drive axles, front steer axles, specialty axles, defence axles, and drum and disc brakes. Automotive Axles has manufacturing plants in Mysore, Karnataka and Jamshedpur, Jharkhand.

Kalyani Global 
Kalyani Global Engineering Private Limited was established in 1985. It is engaged in the urban infrastructure and construction industry.

Hikal 
Hikal Limited is a specialty chemicals company established in 1988. It manufactures active ingredients and intermediates, and provides R&D services for pharmaceutical, animal health, biotech, and crop protection companies.

Kalyani Maxion Wheels 
Baba Kalyani established a wheel manufacturing facility in Chakan, Pune, at the request of Ratan Tata, with technology from Hayes Lemmerz. Kalyani Lemmerz Ltd (KLL) was established as joint venture between the Kalyani Group (75%) and Hayes Lemmerz International Inc (25%) in 1996. In 1998, Hayes Lemmerz  increased its stake in the company to 85%, with the Kalyani Group holding the remaining 15%. In February 2007, Kalyani Lemmerz announced that it would invest $25 million to expand capacity at its wheel manufacturing facility at Chakan. Hayes Lemmerz International Inc was acquired by Brazilian company Iochpe-Maxion in October 2011. Kalyani Lemmerz Ltd. was renamed Kalyani Maxion Wheels Ltd. following the acquisition.

BF Utilities 
BF Utilities Limited was established on 15 September 2000 as a result of the demerger of the Investment and Windmills division of Bharat Forge Limited. The Investment business was demerged again from BF Utilities Ltd to a new company called BF Investment Ltd. (BFIL) on 14 January 2011.

Kalyani Investment 
Kalyani Investment Company Limited (KICL) was established on 25 June 2009 by demerging the Investment business of Kalyani Steels and amalgamating it with the "Investment Undertaking" of three Kalyani Steel subsidiaries.

BF Investment 
BF Investment Ltd. (BFIL) was established on 14 January 2011 as result of the demerger of the Investment division from BF Utilities Ltd. BFIL holds stakes in several other Kalyani Group companies.

Baramati Speciality Steels 
Baramati Speciality Steels Limited (BSSL) was founded in 2011. It is located in Satara, Maharashtra.

Saarloha Advanced Materials 
Kalyani Group aims to manufacture 250,000 tonnes of 'green steel' from its electric arc furnace plant in Pune operated by Saarloha Advanced Materials. The Green steel under the brand KALYANI FeRRESTA & KALYANI FeRRESTA PLUS are manufactured in an Electric Arc Furnace using electricity from 100% of renewable energy sources and more than 70% recycled scrap material with zero GHG footprint

Synise Technologies 
Synise Technologies Ltd. is a company focused on procurement and Selling Services.

KCTI 
Kalyani Centre for Technology and Innovation (KCTI) is an ISO17025 NABL certified laboratory established in Pune by the Kalyani Group at an investment of $14 million. The lab is recognized by the Department of Science and Technology, and by Rolls-Royce and Boeing.

Former companies

Bharat FC

Kalyani Group forayed into Indian football by launching a football club named Kalyani Bharat FC on 23 November 2014. The club began competing in I-league from January 2015, and were given a direct entry to I-league by the AIFF as an initiative to bring corporates into football. Bharat FC was the 2nd team to enter I-league under this initiative after JSW Group-led Bengaluru FC which entered the league in 2013–14 season. Bharat FC played only one season of the I-League, finishing at the bottom of the table, before closing down.

Kalyani Brakes 
Kalyani Brakes was a joint venture company in which the Kalyani Group and Bosch held a 40% stake each. The company manufactured conventional braking systems and components for passenger cars, tractors, three-wheelers and two-wheelers. Bosch bought out the Kalyani Group's stake in the joint venture in January 2013. Kalyani Brakes was renamed Bosch Chassis Systems India.

Kenersys GmbH 
The Kalyani Group acquired Münster, Germany-based wind energy and design consulting firm RSB Consult GmbH on 3 September 2007 for an undisclosed amount. The company was renamed Kenersys GmbH, an abbreviation for Kalyani Energy Systems. US-based private equity firm First Reserve Corporation acquired a stake in Kenersys in April 2008. Kalyani Group appointed Paulo Fernando, who was previously the CEO of Suzlon China, as the new CEO of Kenersys in June 2010. In September 2010, Kenersys was awarded a contract by Bharat Forge to build a 8 MW wind turbine in Satara district, Maharashtra. Kenersys established a wind turbine production plant at Baramati, Pune district in September 2011. In August 2016, the Kalyani Group reached an agreement to sell Kenersys to German wind turbine manufacturer Senvion for an estimated .

Alstom Bharat Forge Power
Alstom Bharat Forge Power Limited was a joint venture between French company Alstom and Bharat Forge. Originally, Alstom held a 51% stake and Bharat Forge held the remaining 49%. Alstom's shares were acquired by American conglomerate General Electric on 25 November 2015 as part of its global acquisition of Alstom's energy business. Alstom Bharat Forge won a contract to supply two units of 660 MW supercritical coal turbines to NTPC Limited for a power plant in Solapur, Maharashtra. Alstom Bharat Forge began production of supercritical turbines and generators at a new manufacturing facility at Sanand, Gujarat in May 2016. The company won a contract to supply two units of 800 MW ultra-supercritical steam turbine generator islands for the Telangana Super Thermal Power Project Phase-1 near Ramagundam. On 8 November 2016, the board of Bharat Forge approved the exit of the company from Alstom Bharat Forge Power. In March 2017, Bharat Forge announced that it would divest 23% of its shares to GE, and the remaining 26% stake was divested in February 2018 completing Bharat Forge's exit from Alstom Bharat Forge Power.

References

External links
Bharat Forge website
Kalyani Steels website
Kalyani Forge website
Kalyani Technoforge website

Conglomerate companies of India
Companies based in Pune
1961 establishments in Maharashtra
Conglomerate companies established in 1961
Indian companies established in 1961
Multinational companies headquartered in India